Enichioi is a commune in Cantemir District, Moldova. It is composed of four villages: Bobocica, Enichioi, Floricica and Țolica.

References

Communes of Cantemir District